Serenjianeh (also Romanized as Serenjīāneh, Saranjeyāneh, Saranjīāneh, and Serenjeyāneh; also known as Sīrenjāneh and Sīrīnjāneh) is a village in Sis Rural District, Bolbanabad District, Dehgolan County, Kurdistan Province, Iran. At the 2006 census, its population was 1,342, in 327 families. The village is populated by Kurds.

References 

Towns and villages in Dehgolan County
Kurdish settlements in Kurdistan Province